This page refers to sports broadcasting contracts in Belgium. For other countries broadcast rights, see Sports television broadcast contracts.

Athletics 
 IAAF World Championships in Athletics: VRT

American football 
 National Football League: MP & Silva with sublicences to Eleven Sports Network

Basketball
 National Basketball Association: Eleven Sports Network (4 games a week)
Pro Basketball League: Proximus Sports Eleven Sports Network (3 games a week)
Euroleague: Play Sports (5 games a week)
Eurocup : Play Sports
Basketball Champions League : Proximus Sports Eleven Sports Network

Cycling
 UCI Road World Championships: VRT
 Amaury Sport Organisation cycling events, such as Tour de France, Vuelta a España, Critérium du Dauphiné, Paris–Roubaix, Liège–Bastogne–Liège, La Flèche Wallonne and Paris–Tours: VRT
 Flanders Classics cycling events, such as Tour of Flanders: VRT
 Italian events, such as Giro d'Italia: VRT
 Belgium National Cycling Championships: VRT

Cyclo-cross
 UCI Cyclo-cross World Championships: VRT 
 UCI Cyclo-cross World Cup: VRT and Plays Sports (Telenet) and Proximus Sports
 Superprestige Veldrijden: Play Sports (Telenet) and Proximus Sports
X²O Badkamers Trofee 2020-2021: VRT
Ethias Cross: VTM
 Belgium National Cyclo-cross Championships: VRT

Field Hockey
FIH:
Men's and Women's Pro Leagues: Play Sports
Eurohockey: Eleven Sports
Men's and Women's European Championships
Men's and Women's European Leagues

Football

Leagues

 Jupiler League: Eleven Sports Network (live), VRT and RTBF (highlights only) (2020-21 until 2024-25).
 Belgian Second Division: Eleven Sports Network (live), VRT and RTBF (highlights only) (2020-21 until 2024-25)
 Belgian Women's Super League: Eleven Sports Network (live) (2020-21 until 2024-25)
 Eredivisie: Play Sports
 English Premier League: Play Sports
 Scottish Premier League: Eleven Sports Network
 Spanish La Liga: Eleven Sports Network and Play Sports (sublicence)
 German Bundesliga: Eleven Sports Network and Play Sports (sublicence)
 Italian Serie A: Eleven Sports Network and Play Sports (sublicence)
 Russian Premier League: Youtube
 Norwegian Eliteserien: Eurosport
 Major League Soccer: Eleven Sports Network (2019-2022)
A-League: Youtube
W-League: Youtube
K-League: Youtube

Domestic Cups

 Belgian Cup: Eleven Sports Network and VRT/VTM/RTL (sublicence)
 Belgian Super Cup: Eleven Sports Network (live), VRT and RTBF (highlights only) (2020-21 until 2024-25)
 English FA Cup: Eleven Sports Network
 English Community Shield: Eleven Sports Network
 DFB-Pokal: Youtube
 DFL-Supercup: Eleven Sports Network
 Coppa Italia: Youtube 
 Supercoppa Italiana: Youtube

International Club Competitions

FIFA Club World Cup: Eurovision (2019 and 2020)
International Champions Cup: Eleven Sports Network
UEFA Champions League: Q2/VIER/Club RTL, Proximus Sports (2021-2024)
 UEFA Europa League: Play Sports, VRT , RTBF (2021-2024)
UEFA Super Cup: Q2/Club RTL, Proximus Sports (2021-2023)
UEFA Youth League: Proximus Sports (2021-2024)
UEFA Women's Champions League: DAZN (2021-2025)

International Matches

 Belgium national team (Nations League, Qualifiers, and Friendlies): VTM, RTL, and RTBF (2022-2028)
European Qualifiers: VTM, RTL, RTBF, (Belgium matches only) and Eleven Sports Network (all matches, exclude Belgium team) (2022-2028)
Other European Nation's Friendlies (exclude Belgium team): Eleven Sports Network (2022-2028)

International Tournaments

 FIFA World Cup: VRT and RTBF
FIFA Women's World Cup: VRT, RTBF, and Eurovision
FIFA Youth World Cups: VRT, RTBF, and Eurovision (2019-2022)
FIFA U-20 World Cup
FIFA U-20 Women's World Cup
FIFA U-17 World Cup
FIFA U-17 Women's World Cup
UEFA Euro: VRT and RTBF
UEFA Nations League: VTM, RTL, RTBF, (Belgium matches and final) and Eleven Sports Network (all matches, exclude Belgium team) (2022-2027)
UEFA U-21 Euro: VRT and RTBF
UEFA Youth Euros: VRT, RTBF, and UEFA.tv
UEFA U-19 Euro
UEFA Women's U-19 Euro
UEFA U-17 Euro
UEFA Women's U-17 Euro

Handball

EHF Champions League Eleven Sports
Handball Bundesliga Play Sports Eleven Sports

Motor Racing
 WRC: Play Sports and RTBF
 FIA Formula One: VRT (only Belgian GP in Dutch), Play Sports (all races in Dutch) and RTBF (some races in French)
 FIA Formula E: Eurosport, Play Sports, Eleven Sports (eSports tournament only), and RTBF
 Moto GP World Championship: Eurosport
MotoAmerica: Eurosport
DTM: Eleven Sports

Olympics
 Summer Olympics: Eurosport  2020 & 2024
 Winter Olympics: Eurosport  2018 & 2022

Boxing 
Dream Boxing: DAZN: October 2022 to October 2025, all fights
Golden Boy: DAZN
Matchroom: DAZN

Kickboxing 
 Glory: VTM 4
King of Kings: DAZN: October 2022 to October 2025, all fights

Mixed Martial Arts 
Bushido MMA: DAZN: October 2022 to October 2025, all fights

Rugby 

 Rugby World Cup: Play Sports

Tennis
 Australian Open: Eurosport
 French Open: Eurosport
 Wimbledon: Eurosport
 U.S. Open: Eurosport

Volleyball
 FIVB World Championship: VRT
 European Volleyball Championship VRT Eleven Sports
 CEV Champions League Elewen Sports
 CEV Cup Eleven Sports

References

Belgium
Television in Belgium
Belgian television-related lists
broadcasting contracts